World Cup Sevens may refer to:

 Rugby World Cup Sevens, a rugby union sevens tournament
 World Sevens, a defunct rugby league sevens tournament